The 1988 Benson and Hedges Open was a men's Grand Prix tennis tournament held in Auckland, New Zealand. It was the 21st edition of the tournament and was played on outdoor hard courts and was held from 4 January to 11 January 1988. Second-seeded Amos Mansdorf won the singles title.

Finals

Singles

 Amos Mansdorf defeated  Ramesh Krishnan 6–3, 6–4
 It was Mansdorf's 1st title of the year and the 3rd of his career.

Doubles
 Martin Davis /  Tim Pawsat defeated  Sammy Giammalva, Jr. /  Jim Grabb 7–6, 7–6
 It was Davis's only title of the year and the 7th of his career. It was Pawsat's only title of the year and the 2nd of his career.

References

External links
 
 ATP – tournament profile
 ITF – tournament edition details

Heineken Open
Heineken
ATP Auckland Open
January 1988 sports events in New Zealand